KDB Mustaed (21) is the only ship of its kind in the Royal Brunei Navy. The vessel is in active service in the Royal Brunei Navy (RBN).

Construction and career 
KDB Mustaed was built by Marinteknik Shipyard in Singapore to a Lürssen FIB25 design  and commissioned on 25 November 2011. She is capable of border patrol, surveillance, fishery protection and high speed interception.

References 

Royal Brunei Navy
Ships of Brunei